Cantarello is an Italian surname. Notable people with the surname include:

 Lorenzo Cantarello (1932–2013), Italian sprint canoer
 Vasco Cantarello (born 1936), Italian rower

Italian-language surnames